The Musée Lenine was a museum devoted to Vladimir Lenin, located at 4, rue Marie-Rose, in the 14th arrondissement of Paris district, France. The museum closed in 2007.

The museum contained the reconstructed apartment where Russian communist Vladimir Lenin, his wife Nadezhda Konstantinovna Krupskaya, and her mother lived from July 1909 to June 1912. It measured .

See also 
 List of museums in Paris
 Tampere Lenin Museum

References 

  Anthony Glyn, Susan Glyn, The Companion Guide to Paris, Companion Guides, Paris, 2000, pages 271-272. .
 Paris.org entry
 Bellaciao articles (French)

Biographical museums in France
Buildings and structures in the 14th arrondissement of Paris
Defunct museums in Paris
Monuments and memorials to Vladimir Lenin